"Kufor a šál" is a song by Marika Gombitová and Janko Lehotský released on OPUS in 1980.
 
The single, written by Janko Lehotský and Kamil Peteraj, was taken from the Gombitová's debut album Dievča do dažďa (1979). An international version of the song was entitled "I'm Flying" in English, and attached to the singer's export album Rainy Day Girl.

B-side of the single featured "Nostalgia", a solo track by Gombitová, also from her debut set.

Official versions
 "Kufor a šál" - Original version, 1979
 "I'm Flying" - International version, 1980

Credits and personnel
 Marika Gombitová – lead vocal
 Janko Lehotský – lead vocal, writer, keyboards
 Ladislav Lučenič – bass guitar, backing vocal
 Cyril Zeleňák – drums, percussion
 František Griglák – solo guitar, synthesizer
 Viliam Pobjecký – solo guitar
 Kamil Peteraj – lyrics
 Ján Lauko – producer
 Milan Vašica – producer
 Ivan Minárik – technical collaboration
 Jozef Hanák – technical collaboration

References

General

Specific

1980 songs
1980 singles
Marika Gombitová songs
Modus (band) songs
Songs written by Ján Lehotský
Songs written by Kamil Peteraj
Slovak-language songs
English-language Slovak songs